Giancarlo Malcore (born 26 December 1993) is an Italian football player, who plays as a forward for Audace Cerignola.

Club career
Born in Milan, province of Milano, he began his career at local club Lecce, playing for the youth teams.

He made his Lega Pro Prima Divisione debut for Lecce on 16 September 2012 in a game against San Marino.

On 31 January 2019, he joined Fermana on loan.

On 17 July 2019, he joined Pergolettese.

References

External links
 
 https://aic.football.it/scheda/26333/malcore-giancarlo.htm

1993 births
Sportspeople from the Province of Brindisi
Footballers from Apulia
Living people
Italian footballers
U.S. Lecce players
A.S.G. Nocerina players
A.S. Cittadella players
S.S. Chieti Calcio players
Paganese Calcio 1926 players
Manfredonia Calcio players
A.C. Carpi players
Fermana F.C. players
U.S. Pergolettese 1932 players
Serie B players
Serie C players
Serie D players
Association football forwards